Kristofer Steen (born June 26, 1974) is a Swedish musician, who is the guitarist for hardcore punk band Refused. He directed Refused Are Fucking Dead, a 2006 documentary charting the demise of Refused in 1998.

After Refused's demise, Steen formed a band called TEXT with fellow Refused guitarist Jon Brännström and Refused drummer David Sandström, as well as embarking upon his own projects. Steen was also involved in the bands Brain Squashed Puppies, Abhinanda and Final Exit. Refused reunited to perform at Coachella 2012.

Discography

With Abhinanda

Senseless (1994)

With Refused

Everlasting (EP) (1995)
Songs to Fan the Flames of Discontent (1996)
The Shape of Punk to Come (1998)
 Freedom (2015)

With Final Exit

Teg (1995)
Umeå (1997)

With TEXT

TEXT (1999)
Vital Signs (2008)

External links
 Refused's page on Kristofer.

1974 births
Living people
Swedish male musicians
Refused members